A.W. Moore may refer to:
 Adolphus Warburton Moore (1841–1887), British civil servant and mountaineer
 Arthur William Moore (1853–1909), Manx historian, folklorist and politician
 Addison Webster Moore (1866–1930), American pragmatist philosopher
 A. W. Moore (philosopher) (born 1956), British philosopher
 A. W. Moore (Texas politician) for Texas Senate, District 26

See also
Moore (surname)